Sir Thomas Cheney (or Cheyne) KG (c. 1485 – 16 December 1558) of the Blackfriars, City of London and Shurland, Isle of Sheppey, Kent, was an English administrator and diplomat, Lord Warden of the Cinque Ports in south-east England from 1536 until his death.

Early life
Thomas Cheney, born about 1485, was the son of William Cheney (d.1487) of Shurland Hall near Eastchurch, in the Isle of Sheppey, Kent, Constable of Queenborough Castle and Sheriff of Kent in 1477, by his second wife, Margaret Young.

Thomas Cheney's father, William, was the eldest surviving of eight sons and a daughter, and at his death in 1487 his property in Kent was inherited by Francis Cheney (d.1512), his son and heir by his first marriage, but was in the possession of Francis Cheney's uncle, John Cheyne, Baron Cheyne until the latter's death without issue in 1499. Baron Cheyne's heir, his brother, Robert Cheney, died without issue in 1503, at which time Francis Cheney 'wrongfully took possession of their lands in Berkshire and Kent which should by an earlier settlement have passed to John, the son of a younger brother Roger'. Francis Cheney died without issue in January 1512, and Thomas Cheney succeeded to his father William's lands; however the other properties wrongfully acquired by Francis Cheney were awarded in 1515 to his cousin, John son of Roger Cheyne (d. 1499) of West Woodhay, Berkshire.

Career

Cheney was appointed Sheriff of Kent in 1515, and was Justice of the Peace for Kent from 1526 until his death.

He was a favourite of Henry VIII's mistress, Anne Boleyn, and she fought Cardinal Wolsey for his promotion in 1528 and 1529, although he later participated in bringing her down. However, it was not until 1535–40 that Cheney consolidated his authority as one of the most powerful men in the south-east of England. From Henry VIII's coming to the throne of England in 1509, Cheney served as Lord Warden, spanning the reigns of all five of the Tudor monarchs.  Cheney was present at the Field of the Cloth of Gold in 1520, and served three times as an ambassador to France, under the authority of Henry VIII and Charles V of France, between 1549 and 1553. He was Treasurer of the Household from early 1530, and he is recorded as being present at over half of the Privy Council meetings held between 1540 and 1543.

He represented Kent as a knight of the shire in every parliament from 1539 to 1558 with the single exception of the election in 1555.

Cheyne was among those councillors entrusted with the government of the realm during Somerset's Scottish campaign of 1547.<p>He was among those who sanctioned Gardiner's imprisonment in June 1548, and he was involved in the interrogation of Sir Thomas Seymour in 1549.

In 1550, he became a privy counsellor and owner of the Manor of Ospringe (in the parish of Faversham).

Cheyne opposed the plan to place Lady Jane Grey on the throne, and although he acquiesced with Northumberland's policy, he pledged his support for Mary I as soon as he felt it safe so to do. So fickle a courtier was he that the Marian Court privately distrusted his loyalty during the outbreak of a rebellion represented for Kent by his "friend and neighbour" Sir Thomas Wyatt in the attack on London in 1554, but the very fact that he sent men against Northumberland indicates something of his position. Cheney was initially distrusted by Mary, as she confessed to the imperial ambassador, his 'early show of support' proving shrewd as Cheney retained his position as Treasurer of the Household whilst other household officers were replaced.

As the Constable of Saltwood Castle (near Hythe), Queenborough Castle (in Sheppey),  Rochester Castle and Dover Castle, Lord Warden of the Cinque Ports and Lord Lieutenant of Kent (1551–3), Thomas Cheney was much 'involved with musters and coastal defence'. Sir Thomas Cheyne was appointed Lord Warden of the Cinque Ports on 17 May 1536 and appears to have been deprived of the office soon after Edward VI's accession, but was granted it back to him the following April.

Conspicuously in April 1545 Cheney suffered a bout of illness, and was temporarily replaced in his duties as the Lord Warden of the Cinque Ports by Sir Thomas Seymour, Hertford's brother. For the next four months Cheney delegated his responsibilities in the Cinque Ports and Kent to Seymour.

Cheney died on 16 December 1558 at the Tower of London, and was buried on 3 January 1559 in St Katherine's chapel of Minster Abbey on the Isle of Sheppey. He was survived by his son, Henry, and three daughters, Anne, Frances and Katherine. His will and the elaborate proceedings at his funeral were entirely consistent with the orthodox Catholicism of the period, showing him to have been conservative. In his will dated 6 December 1558, Cheney mentioned various properties which together gave him an annual rent of over £950, and after his death it was estimated that he maintained between 200 and 300 servants and retainers.

Marriages and issue
Cheney married firstly, by 1515, Frideswide Frowyk (died c. 1528), the daughter of Sir Thomas Frowyk, by whom he had a son and three daughters:

John Cheney, who predeceased his father
Anne Cheney (d. 1553), who married Sir John Perrot, Lord Deputy of Ireland
Frances Cheney (d. 1561), who married Nicholas Crispe (d. 1564)
Katherine Cheney (d. before 1550), who married Sir Thomas Kempe (d. 7 March 1591) of Olantigh in Wye, Kent, by whom she had three daughters, Margaret Kempe, who married William Cromer (d. 12 May 1598); Anne Kempe, who married Sir Thomas Shirley, and Alice Kempe, who married firstly Sir James Hales (d. 1589), grandson of Sir James Hales (d. 1554), and secondly Sir Richard Lee (d.1608), illegitimate half-brother of Queen Elizabeth's champion, Sir Henry Lee

According to Lennard, Anne, Frances and Katherine were all daughters of Cheney's first marriage:

Sir Henry Cheyne, knight, summoned in 1572 as Lord Cheyne of Toddington, died s.p. in 1587, having wasted his estate. His three half-sisters, daughters of the first marriage of his father Sir Thomas Cheyne of Sheppey, K.G., were his coheirs. Anne Cheyne, the third of these, was the first wife of Sir John Perrot, the lord deputy of Ireland, and mother of Sir Thomas Perrot his heir. Sir John Perrot, who was reckoned a bastard son of Henry VIII., died in 1592.

Cheney married secondly, by dispensation dated 24 May 1539, Anne Broughton (d. 16 May 1562), stepdaughter and ward of John Russell, 1st Earl of Bedford, and daughter of Sir John Broughton (d. 24 January 1518). of Toddington, Bedfordshire, by Anne Sapcote (d. 14 March 1559), and granddaughter of Sir Robert Broughton by his first wife, Katherine de Vere, said to have been the illegitimate daughter of John de Vere, 13th Earl of Oxford, by whom he had a son, Henry Cheyne, 1st Baron Cheyne of Toddington, and a daughter. There is a monument to Cheyney's second wife at Toddington.

Cheney also had an illegitimate son and daughter.

References

Sources

External links
Will of Sir Thomas Cheyney or Chayney, Treasurer of the Queen's Majesty's Most Honorable Household, proved 25 April 1559, PROB 11/42B/105, National Archives Retrieved 21 August 2013

1480s births
1558 deaths
Knights of the Garter
Lord-Lieutenants of Kent
Lords Warden of the Cinque Ports
People from the Isle of Sheppey
Treasurers of the Household
Thomas
High Sheriffs of Kent
English MPs 1529–1536
English MPs 1539–1540
English MPs 1542–1544
English MPs 1545–1547
English MPs 1547–1552
English MPs 1553 (Edward VI)
English MPs 1553 (Mary I)
English MPs 1554
English MPs 1554–1555
English MPs 1558
People from Hythe, Kent